Jérémy Jaunin is a Swiss professional basketball player.

Professional career
Jérémy Jaunin started his career with Bernex Basket. In 2010, he switched teams within the Canton of Geneva and joined Lions de Genève where he stayed until 2016. 

From 2016 to 2020, Jaunin played for league competitor Fribourg Olympic under the lead of head coach Petar Aleksić. 

In April 2020, he rejoined his former team Lions de Genève. Jaunin signed for one season. Back in Geneva, Jaunin has been reunited with head coach Andrej Stimac, a former teammate who was also part of the squad that won the Swiss Basketball League Championship in 2013 and 2015.

Swiss national team
Jaunin has been a member of the Swiss national basketball team.

References

External links
FIBA Profile 
Profile at REALGM.com
Profile at Eurobasket.com

1991 births
Living people
Fribourg Olympic players
Lions de Genève players
Point guards
Sportspeople from Geneva
Swiss men's basketball players